Marasmodes is a genus of South African shrubs in the chamomile tribe within the daisy family.

 Species
 Marasmodes dummeri Bolus ex Hutch.
 Marasmodes oligocephalus DC.
 Marasmodes polycephalus DC.
 Marasmodes undulatus Compton

References

Anthemideae
Asteraceae genera
Endemic flora of South Africa